Matei Gantner is a male former international table tennis player from Romania.

He won a bronze medal at the 1956 World Table Tennis Championships in the Swaythling Cup (men's team event) with Toma Reiter, Tiberiu Harasztosi, Paul Pesch and Mircea Popescu for Romania. 

He also won the national Championships seven times, three in singles (1954, 1958, 1960), two in doubles (1955, 1957 with Toma Reiter) and two in mixed (1957 and 1958 with Ella Zeller in addition to a bronze medal in the 1958 European Championships.

See also
 List of table tennis players
 List of World Table Tennis Championships medalists

References

Romanian male table tennis players
1934 births
Living people
World Table Tennis Championships medalists